Jill Esmond (born Jill Esmond Moore; 26 January 1908 – 28 July 1990) was an English stage and screen actress. She was the first wife of Laurence Olivier.

Early life
Esmond was born in London, the daughter of stage actors Henry V. Esmond and Eva Moore. Dramatist W.S. Gilbert and actress Maxine Elliott were her godparents. One of her maternal aunts was Decima Moore.

She had a brother Jack (an actor) and a sister, Lynette, who did not survive infancy.

While her parents toured with theatre companies, Esmond spent her childhood in boarding schools until she decided at the age of 14 to become an actress. She made her stage debut playing Wendy to Gladys Cooper's Peter Pan, but her success was short-lived. When her father died suddenly in 1922, in Paris, due to pneumonia, Esmond returned to school and at the time considered abandoning her ambition to act.

After reassessing her future and coming to terms with her father's death, she studied with the Royal Academy of Dramatic Art in London, and returned to the West End stage in 1924. In 1925, she starred with her mother in a play Mary, Mary Quite Contrary, and after a few more successful roles, won critical praise for her part as a young suicide in Outward Bound.

Marriage and career

In 1928, Esmond (billed as Jill Esmond Moore) appeared in the production of Bird in the Hand, where she met fellow cast member Laurence Olivier for the first time. Three weeks later, he proposed to her. In his autobiography Olivier later wrote that he was smitten with Esmond, and that her cool indifference to him did nothing but further his ardour. When Bird in the Hand was being staged on Broadway, Esmond was chosen to join the American production – but Olivier was not.

Determined to be near Esmond, Olivier travelled to New York City where he found work as an actor. Esmond won rave reviews for her performance. Olivier continued to follow Esmond, and after proposing to her several times, she agreed and the couple were married on 25 July 1930 at All Saints', Margaret Street, London. Within weeks, the couple regretted their marriage. They had one son, Tarquin Olivier (born 21 August 1936).

Returning to the United Kingdom, Esmond made her film debut with a starring role in an early Alfred Hitchcock film The Skin Game (1931), and over the next few years appeared in several British and (pre-Code) Hollywood films, including Thirteen Women (1932). She also appeared in two Broadway productions with Olivier, Private Lives in 1931 with Noël Coward and Gertrude Lawrence and The Green Bay Tree in 1933.

Esmond's career continued to ascend while Olivier's own career languished, but after a couple of years, when his career began to show promise, she began to refuse roles. Esmond had been promised a role by David O. Selznick in A Bill of Divorcement (1932) but at only half-salary. Olivier had discovered that Katharine Hepburn had been offered a much greater salary, and convinced Esmond to turn down the role.

Esmond and Olivier starred together in one film, No Funny Business (1933), a British comedy film directed by Victor Hanbury.

In 1937, Esmond and Olivier appeared together  in Shakespeare's "Twelfth Night" at London's Old Vic theatre. During this period, their marriage was disintegrating, as Olivier had started a relationship with Vivien Leigh.

Later years
Esmond starred in the Broadway production of Emlyn Williams' play The Morning Star in 1942, a production which featured the acting debut of Gregory Peck. Her acting appearances grew more sporadic with the passage of time, and she made her final film appearance in 1955, around the time she made her two appearances as Eleanor of Aquitaine in the TV series The Adventures of Robin Hood.

Personal life

Esmond was married to Olivier between 1930 and 1940; they had one son, Tarquin Olivier (born 21 August 1936). During their marriage, Olivier had affairs with Ann Todd and Vivien Leigh, the latter to whom he was married from 1940 to 1960. Olivier later said that "I couldn't help myself with Vivien. No man could. I hated myself for cheating on Jill, but then I had cheated before, but this was something different. This wasn't just out of lust. This was love that I really didn't ask for but was drawn into."

Esmond withstood the publicity of Olivier's affair with Vivien Leigh and did not seek a divorce. Pressed by Olivier, who was anxious to marry Leigh, she eventually agreed and they were divorced on 29 January 1940. During the war years, she stayed in the United States, where she appeared mostly in character actor roles in several films, and her son also was briefly a child actor. Among the films she appeared in are  Journey for Margaret, The Pied Piper and Random Harvest, all in 1942, My Pal Wolf (1944), The White Cliffs of Dover (1944) and The Bandit of Sherwood Forest (1946). In 1946, she returned to the UK where she resumed her acting; her last stage appearance was in 1950, and her last film in 1955.

To the end of his life, Olivier continued alimony payments to Esmond. Esmond kept in touch with Olivier, and in a letter to their son Tarquin, said "It's funny after all that time how I can still love him so much." Frail and in a wheelchair, she attended Olivier's memorial service in October 1989 at Westminster Abbey.

Death
Esmond was 82 years old when she died on 28 July 1990 in Wandsworth, London.

Complete filmography

 The Chinese Bungalow (1930) - Jean
 The Skin Game (1931) - Jill Hillcrist
 The Eternal Feminine (1931) - Claire Lee
 Once a Lady (1931) - Faith Penwick the Girl
 Ladies of the Jury (1932) - Mrs. Yvette Gordon
 State's Attorney (1932) - Lillian Ulrich
 Is My Face Red? (1932) - Mildred Huntington
 Thirteen Women (1932) - Jo Turner
 F.P.1 Doesn't Answer (1933) - Claire Lennartz
 No Funny Business (1933) - Anne
 On the Spot (1938, version of the 1938 TV movie) - Minn Lee
 Prison Without Bars (1939, TV Movie) - Carol Linden, Superintendent
 On the Sunny Side (1942) - Mrs. Aylesworth
 This Above All (1942) - Nurse Emily Harvey
 Eagle Squadron (1942) - Phyllis
 The Pied Piper (1942) - Mrs. Cavanaugh
 Journey for Margaret (1942) - Susan Fleming
 Random Harvest (1942) - Lydia
 The White Cliffs of Dover (1944) - Rosamund
 Casanova Brown (1944) - Dr. Zernerke
 My Pal Wolf (1944) - Miss Elizabeth Munn
 The Bandit of Sherwood Forest (1946) - The Queen Mother
 Bedelia (1946) - Nurse Harris
 Escape (1948) - Grace Winton
 Private Information (1952) - Charlotte
 Night People (1954) - Frau Schindler
 A Man Called Peter (1955) - Mrs. Findlay

Selected stage appearances
 Gertie Maude by John Van Druten (1937)
 Party Manners by Val Gielgud (1950)

References

Notes

Citations

Bibliography

 Barker, Felix. Laurence Olivier: A Critical Study. Speldhurst, Kent, UK: Spellmount, 1984. .
 
 
 Cottrell, John. Laurence Olivier. New York: Prentice-Hall, 1975. .
 
 Madsen, Axel. The Sewing Circle: Sappho's Leading Ladies. London: Kensington Books, 2002. .
 
 Olivier, Tarquin. My Father Laurence Olivier. London: Headline Books, 1992. .
 Spoto, Donald. Laurence Olivier: A Biography. London: Cooper Square Press, 2001. .

External links

English film actresses
English stage actresses
English LGBT actors
Actresses from London
1908 births
1990 deaths
20th-century English actresses
Alumni of RADA
Spouses of life peers
20th-century English LGBT people